The 1965 Iowa State Cyclones football team represented Iowa State University in the Big Eight Conference during the 1965 NCAA University Division football season. In their eighth year under head coach Clay Stapleton, the Cyclones compiled a 5–4–1 record (3–3–1 against conference opponents), finished in fourth place in the conference, and outscored their opponents by a combined total of 178 to 147. They played their home games at Clyde Williams Field in Ames, Iowa.

The regular starting lineup on offense consisted of left end Eppie Barney, left tackle John Chism, left guard Dennis Storey, right guard Rick Burchett, right tackle Larry Brazon, right end George Maurer, quarterback Tim Van Galder, halfbacks Les Webster and Tom Busch, and fullback Tony Baker.

The regular starting lineup on defense consisted of defensive ends Dennis Esselmann and Ernie Kennedy, defensive tackles Wayne Lueders and Sam Ramenofsky, defensive guards Bob Evans and Frank Belichick, linebackers Jim Wipert and Ron Halda, cornerbacks Doug Robinson and Larry Carwell, and safety Cal Lewis. Steve Balkovec was the punter and placekicker.

Dick Kasperek and Jimmy Wipert were the team captains. Three Iowa State players were selected as first-team all-conference players: Eppie Barney, Ron Halda, and Dick Kasperek.

Schedule

References

Iowa State
Iowa State Cyclones football seasons
Iowa State Cyclones football